The Temple of Jupiter Stator can refer to three temples in ancient city of Rome:

Temple of Jupiter Stator (3rd century BC)
Temple of Jupiter Stator (2nd century BC)
Temple of Jupiter Stator (Flavian Period), most likely situated where now stand the remains of the Temple of Romulus